Arnold Lee Mickens Jr. (October 12, 1972 – January 18, 2022) was an American football running back who played one season with the Indianapolis Colts of the National Football League. He first enrolled at Indiana University Bloomington before transferring to Butler University. He attended Broad Ripple High School in Indianapolis, Indiana.

Arnold Mickens Jr. was a member of Phi Beta Sigma Fraternity.

References

External links
Just Sports Stats
Butler Bulldogs bio

1972 births
2022 deaths
Players of American football from Indianapolis
American football running backs
African-American players of American football
Indiana Hoosiers football players
Butler Bulldogs football players
Indianapolis Colts players
21st-century African-American sportspeople
20th-century African-American sportspeople